This page list topics related to Greece.



0-9

1st Infantry Regiment
32nd Marines Brigade
1906 Intercalated Games
2007 Greek forest fires
2020 in Greece

A

Academy of Athens (modern)
Acarnania
Achaea 
Achelous River
Acheron
Acropolis Museum 
Administrative divisions of Greece
Aegean Islands
Aegina
Aetolia
Aetolia-Acarnania
Agia Efthymia
Agioi Theodoroi (islands)
Agistri
Agora
Agoraios Kolonos
Agrinio
Agrotissa
Aigeira
Akadimia Platonos 
Akrotiri, Santorini
Alea, Argolis
Alexander the Great
Alfeios
Aliartos
Alopekis
Alpha
Alyzia
Amfikleia
Ampelokipoi, Athens
Anafiotika
Anavyssos
Andros
Ano Dorio
Ano Liosia
Antikyra
Antikythera
Aperantia
Arcadia (region)
Archaeological Museum of Amphipolis
Archaeological Museum of Mykonos
Archaeological Museum of Pella
Archaeological Museum of Piraeus
Archaeological Museum of Sparta
Archaeological Park of Dion
Areopagus
Argead dynasty
Argolid Peninsula
Argolis
Argos, Peloponnese
Arta
Artemida, Attica
Artemisio
Assyrians in Greece
Astypalaia
Athens
Athens City Museum
Athens Classic Marathon
Athens Concert Hall
Athens Conservatoire
Athens Exchange
Athens International Airport
Athens Mass Transit System
Athens Metro
Athens Polytechnic uprising
Athens Riviera
Athens Tram
Atsipades

B

Bank of Greece
Bassae
Beta
Boeotia
Bouzouki
British School at Athens
Byzantine Empire

C

Cabinet of Greece
Cape Matapan
Capital punishment in Greece
Center for Literature and Arts, Dion
Central Greece
Cephalonia
Chaeronea
Chalandri
Chalcis 
Chalkidiki
Church of Greece
Cithaeron
Climate of Greece
Commemorative coins of Greece 
Conscription in Greece
Constantinople
Constitution of Greece
Copyright law of Greece
Corfu
Corycian Cave
Cretan wine
Crete
Crime in Greece
Cyclades
Cynuria

D

Dafni, Attica
Davleia
Delos
Delphi
Delphi Archaeological Museum
Delta (letter)
Demographic history of Greece
Demographics of Greece
Dendra
Dion, Pieria 
Dionysus mosaic, Dion
Dipylon
Dodecanese
Dodoni
Dolopia
Dorio, Messenia

E

Echinades
Economy of Greece
Ecumenical Patriarchate of Constantinople
Education in Greece
Efyra
Egaleo F.C.
Elections in Greece
Eleusis
Elis (regional unit)
Energy in Greece
Environmental issues in Greece
Ephorate of Antiquities of Karditsa
Epirus (region)
Epsilon
Epsilon Team
Eretria
Ermioni
Euboea
Euro gold and silver commemorative coins
Eurotas (river)
Evzones
Exclusive economic zone of Greece

F

Fall of Constantinople
Farantouri, Maria
Fira
First Army
Flag of Greece
Florina
Folegandros
Foloi oak forest
Foreign relations of Greece
France–Greece relations

G

Geography of Greece
German Archaeological Institute at Athens 
Gioura
Goritsa (Greece) 
Gortyn
Government of Greece
Gravia
Great Famine
Greece
Greek art
Greek cuisine
Greek dances
Greek destroyer Aetos (1912) 
Greek diaspora
Greek drachma
Greek dress
Greek euro coins
Greek language
Greek Merchant Marine 
Greek minuscule
Greek name
Greek National Opera
Greek nationality law
Greek National Road 5
Greek National Road 111
Greek shipping
Greek War of Independence
Greek Youth Symphony Orchestra
Greeks
Greeks in Italy
Gymnasium (ancient Greece)
Gytheio

H

Hadrian's Library
Halki (Greece)
Hellenic Armed Forces
Hellenic Parliament
Hellenic Police 
Hellenistic period
Hippocrates
Heraklion
Hersonissos
Hinduism in Greece
History of Greece
Hotel Grande Bretagne
Hydra (island)
Hymettus
Hymn to Liberty

I

Ialysos
Ibycus
Icaria
Ierakas
Ilioupoli
Ilisos
Ioannina
Ioannina (regional unit)
Ionian Islands
Ios (island)
Iota
Irakleia, Elis 
Iraklis Thessaloniki F.C.
Islands (regional unit)
Isocrates
Ithaca
Ithome

J

K

Kalamata
Kalapodi
Kalaureia
Kalavryta
Kallergis, Dimitrios
Kallithea, Rhodes
Kalolimnos
Kamares, Crete
Kamena Vourla
Kampos, Messenia
Kanalia
Kanianitis
Kappa
Kapsas
Kardamaina
Kardamyli
Karditsa (regional unit)
Karfi
Karpathos
Karyes
Karystos
Kasos
Kassandreia
Kastellorizo
Kastri, Preveza
Katakolo
Katharevousa
Kato Samiko
Kavala
Kavousi Kastro
Kavousi Vronda
Kazantzakis, Nikos
Kea (island)
Kerameikos Archaeological Museum
Keratea
Kifissia
Kilkis (regional unit)
Knossos
Kolonos
Kolonos Hill
Koroni
Korydallos
Kos
Koumanis 
Kouroupa
Kranidi
Kynosargous
Kypseli, Athens
Kyra Panagia
Kythira

L

Ladon (river)
Lagonisi
Lake Marathon
Lambda
Lamia (city)
Larissa
Laurium
Lechaio
Lefkada
Lefkandi
Lemnos
Leochares
Leonidas I
Leros
Lesbian wine
Lesbos
Lindos
Livadeia

M

Macedonia (Greece)
Magnesia (regional unit)
Magoula
Mainalo, Arcadia
Mantzaros, Nikolaos
Marathon, Greece
Mass media in Greece
MediaInspector Greece
Megalopolis, Greece
Mercouri, Melina
Metaxa
Methana
Methoni, Messenia
Milos
Ministry of Culture and Sports
Ministry of Justice
Minorities in Greece
Missolonghi
Modern Greek
Modern Greek grammar
Modern Greek literature
Mount Athos
Mount Cirphis
Mount Olympus
Mount Phoukas
Moustalevria
Mu (letter)
Munichia
Museum of Ancient Greek Technology
Museum of the History of the Greek Costume
Music of Epirus
Mygdonia, Thessaloniki
Mykines, Greece 
Mykonos
Mystras

N

Nafpaktos
Nafplio
National and Kapodistrian University of Athens
National emblem of Greece
National Garden, Athens
National Library of Greece
National parks of Greece
National Roads and Motorways in Greece 
National Theatre of Greece
Naxos
Naxos and Lesser Cyclades
Nea Koutali
Nea Poteidaia
Nemea (town)
New Democracy (Greece)
Nu (letter)
Nisyros

O

Old Acropolis Museum 
Olympia, Greece
Olympiacos F.C.
Olympic Stadium (Athens)
Omega
Omicron
Omonoia Square
Oropos
Orthodoxy in Greece
Othonoi
Ottoman Greece

P

Palaio Faliro
Palairos
Palamidi
Pallini
Panathenaic Stadium
Pangrati
Panhellenic Socialist Movement
Parnitha
Paros
Patras
Peloponnese
Peristera
Petaloudes
Phaistos
Phocis
Phoenix (currency)
Phthiotis 
Piperi (island)
Piraeus 
Pisa, Greece
Plataies
Pnyx
Politics of Greece
Polychrono
Poros
Porto Cheli
Porto Rafti 
President of Greece
Preveza
Prime Minister of Greece
Psofida
Psychiko
Public holidays in Greece
Pythagoreio

Q

R

Regional units of Greece
Religion in Greece
Renewable energy in Greece
Rethymno
Rho
Rhodes
Rhodes (city)
Rineia
Rio–Antirrio Bridge

S

Salamis Island
Samos
Samos International Airport
Samothrace
Saronida
Sellasia
Serene Grand Orient of Greece
Serifos 
Sifnos
Sigma
Sikinos
Skantzoura
Skoda Xanthi F.C.
Skopelos
Skotina
Skotino cave
Skyros
Sounion
South Aegean
Sparta
Sparta, Laconia 
Spartathlon
Spathes
Spetses
Sphacteria
Sporades
Stamata
Stouronisi
Stratos, Greece
Stymfalia
Swedish Institute at Athens
Swiss School of Archaeology in Greece
Symi

T

Tanagra
Tatoi Palace
Taxation in Greece
Telecommunications in Greece 
Television in Greece
Thasos
Thasos (town)
Theodorakis, Mikis
Thermo, Greece
Thespies
Thessaloniki
Thessaloniki (regional unit)
Thessaloniki Underwater Artery
Thisvi
Tilos
Timeline of modern Greek history
Tiryns
Titani
Titarisios
Tithorea
Tourism in Greece
Tripoli, Greece
Tsarouchi
Tsoungria

U

University of Athens
Upsilon

V

Vagia
Vai (Crete)
Vale of Tempe
Vangelis
Vardar
Vari
Vari Cave
Veria
Varieties of Modern Greek
Vlochos
Volos

W

Water supply and sanitation in Greece
West Greece
Western Thrace
West Macedonia

X

Xanthi
Xenophon
Xi (letter)
Xiromero
Xylokastro

Y

Yirise
Ypsilantis

Z

Zakynthos
Zakynthos (city)
Zakynthos International Airport
Zeta
Zeto
Zoitakis, Georgios
Zorba the Greek (film)

See also
Index of ancient Greece-related articles
Outline of Greece
Lists of country-related topics – similar lists for other countries

Lists

Banks in Greece
Earthquakes in Greece
Football clubs in Greece
Gates in Greece
Greek countries and regions
Greek subdivisions by GDP
Islands of Greece
Lakes of Greece
Museums in Greece
Newspapers in Greece
Political parties in Greece
Settlements in Attica
Volcanoes in Greece
Years in Greece

Greece